Boulet, the pen name for Gilles Roussel, is a French comic book creator and cartoonist born 1 February 1975 in Meaux, France. He was among the first French cartoonists to become famous by publishing a blog BD, starting in July 2004.

Biography
Roussel studied art at the Graduate School of Decorative Arts in Strasbourg. In 2001, he published his first comic strip, Raghnarok. He then started a cartoon blog on the internet in July 2004, which made him well known in France. Since then, he has worked for French comics strip magazine Tchô ! and Psikopat, and on many others as an author or cartoonist. He replaced Lewis Trondheim as cartoonist of the comic strip Donjon Zénith.

The popularity of his blog allowed him to become the first "Godfather" of the newly created Paris Comic Strip Blog Festival (Festival des blogs BD), in 2005.

The drawings from his blog were first published in 2008, entitled "Notes". Eleven volumes have been published as of November 2021.

Roussel participated in the French-speaking 24-hour comics day in Montreal in 2008.

He started an English version of his blog in November 2009, where he republished all of his posts from the French blog from its start in 2004 in chronological order, at the rate of three posts per week.

In 2017, Boulet started a collaboration with the publisher Delcourt in order to produce Project Octopus, a collection of scientific comic books evoking subjects as diverse as the exploration of Mars to philosophy. Four to five books a year are planned to be released under this project. These books are written and drawn by artists such as Florence Porcel, Erwann Surcouf, and Héloïse Chochois, but are edited by Boulet.

Bibliography
 Raghnarok, published by Glénat
 Dragon Junior, published by Glénat, 2001 
 Fées et gestes, 2002 
 Terreurs de la nature, 2003 
 Légendes urbaines, 2005 
 Tempus fugit, 2007 
 Casus Belli, 2009 
 La Rubrique Scientifique, published by Glénat
 Tome 1, 2002 
 Tome 2, 2004 
 Tome 3, 2005 
 Womoks,  with Reno, published by Glénat
 Mutant suspends ton vol !, 2001 
 Le Croiseur s'amuse, 2002 
 Albon, les brutes et les truands, 2004 
 Le vœu de... (script), with Lucie Albon (drawing), published by La boîte à bulles
 Le vœu de Marc with Nicolas Wild, 2005 
 Le vœu de Simon with Lucie Albon, 2007 
 Le Miya with Reno and Libon, published by Glénat, 2005 
 Donjon Zénith, (cartoonist) with Lewis Trondheim, Joann Sfar (co-authors) and Lucie Albon (color), published by Delcourt
 5. Un mariage à part, 2006 
 6. Retour en fanfare, 2007 
 7. Hors des remparts, 2020
 Jour de neige in Boule de neige with Lewis Trondheim, Mathieu Sapin and Lisa Mandel published by Delcourt, 2007
 Notes, collection Shampooing, published by Delcourt
 Born to be a larve (July 2004 - July 2005), 2008
 Le petit théâtre de la rue (July 2005 - July 2006), 2009
 La viande, c'est la force (July 2006 - July 2007), 2009
 Songe est Mensonge (July 2007 - July 2008), 2010
 Quelques minutes avant la fin du monde (July 2008 – July 2009), 2011.
 Debout mes globules (July 2009 – July 2010), 2011.
 Formicapunk (July 2010 – July 2011), 2012.
 Les 24 heures (Angoulême festival 24-hour comic contest), 2013.
 Peu d'or et moult gueule, (July 2011 – July 2013), 2014.
 Le Pixel quantique, 2016
 Un royaume magique, 2018
 Chicou Chicou with Lisa Mandel / Juan, Aude Picault / Claude, Domitille Collarday / Frédé, Erwann Surcouf / Fern and Boulet / Ella, published by Delcourt, 2008
 La page blanche (writer) with Pénélope Bagieu, published by Delcourt, 2013
 Bolchoi Arena (writer), with Aseyn (cartoonist), Delcourt, coll. « Hors Collection » :
 Caelum incognito, 2018
 La Somnambule, 2020

Other books
 Soupir with Laureline Michaut, Erwann Surcouf, Cha, Arthur De Pins, published by Nekomix, 2006
 Nekomix 7 : spécial Cinéma with Erwann Surcouf, Phicil, Drac, Tomatias, Amandine, published by Nekomix, 2008
 Erik le Viking, (cartoonist), author Terry Jones, Fantasy collection, published by Bragelonne, 2008 
 Zach Weinersmith, Augie and the Green Knight, 2015.
 Neil Gaiman, Par bonheur, le lait, published by Au Diable Vauvert, 2015. 
 Pulsions : un spectacle graphique (cartoonist) with Kyan Khojandi and Bruno Muschio, published by éditions Albin Michel, 2019 .
 Le joli Coco est un joli Coco'' (cartoonist) with Capucine, published by Lapin Éditions, 2020

See also
List of cartoonists

Notes

References

Boulet at Bedetheque 
Boulet at Lambiek's Comiclopedia

External links

 Official weblog 
 Official weblog in English

Interviews
 An interview with G. Roussel 
 interview at the Paris book festival (Salon du livre de Paris) 

Comic strip cartoonists
Living people
People from Meaux
French webcomic creators
1975 births